The Intrusive Suite of Buena Vista Crest is an intrusive suite which extends  southward, from Yosemite Valley to Yosemite National Park's southeastern boundary, into plutons of the Sierra Nevada Batholith, which are slightly older.  These intrusive suites also include

 Fine Gold Intrusive Suite
 Intrusive Suite of Jack Main Canyon
 Intrusive Suite of Merced Peak
 Intrusive Suite of Sonora Pass
 Intrusive Suite of Yosemite Valley
 Tuolumne Intrusive Suite

The age of the Intrusive Suite of Buena Vista Crest

The Intrusive Suite of Buena Vista Crest came to be roughly 100 to 90  Ma. It is roughly the same age as the Washburn Lake Intrusive Suite and the Merced Peak Intrusive Suite, both of which are to the east of the Intrusive Suite of Buena Vista Crest.

References

External links and references

 HOW DEEP WAS THE INTRUSIVE SUITE OF BUENA VISTA CREST?  CONTRASTING RESULTS FROM HORNBLENDE-PLAGIOCLASE THERMOBAROMETRY OF GRANODIORITES AND ZIRCON GEOCHRONOLOGY OF BROADLY COEVAL VOLCANICS (MINARETS AND MERCED PEAK COMPLEXES), SIERRA NEVADA BATHOLITH, CALIFORNIA
  Instrusive Suite of Buena Vista Crest

Geology of California
Geology of Yosemite National Park